Rossana Neffa de los Rios (born 16 September 1975) is a retired tennis player from Paraguay. She was born in the Paraguayan capital, Asunción, and now lives in Miami, Florida, with her daughter Ana Paula Neffa de los Ríos and her husband Gustavo Neffa, a retired Paraguayan Association football player who played for Boca Juniors. De los Ríos achieved career-high WTA rankings of No. 51 in singles and 52 in doubles. She played doubles with Grand Slam champions such as Maria Sharapova, Svetlana Kuznetsova, Arantxa Sánchez Vicario, as well as Jelena Janković and Dinara Safina. She is also a former world number one junior player, having won the 1992 Roland Garros Juniors event. De los Ríos participated in six editions (1994, 2001, 2002, 2003, 2009 and 2010) of the Australian Open. She was the only female tennis representative for Paraguay in the 1992 and 2000 Olympic Games. De los Ríos was also in Paraguay's Fed Cup team in 1991 and 1992, and the Pan American team in 1999.

Career summary

1989–1994
As a 14-year-old, de los Ríos played just three matches, and won the first match of her career on the ITF circuit in São Paulo. In 1990, she played twelve matches, winning six of them. In May 1991, she won her first ever ITF title, in Francaville, and the next month lost the final in Modena. In September, she won her second ITF title, in Lima, without dropping a set; her win–loss record for the year was 40–18. The following year, she won her third title, in Santa Maria Capua Vetere in October, where she beat Silvia Farina Elia. The following week she reached the final in Asunción, and then the final in Mildura. Her win–loss record for the year was 34–19. As well as being the world number-one junior in 1992 and won the 1992 Junior French Open, beating Paola Suárez 6–4, 6–0 in the final.

At the 1992 Summer Olympics, she would meet her future husband, Gustavo Neffa, who was at the tournament representing the Paraguay national under-23 football team whilst she was representing Paraguay's tennis team.

In 1993, she made the final in Caserta in June as she turned professional. As the world number 118, she caused a big upset at the Puerto Rican Open by defeating top seed and world number 30, Brenda Schultz-McCarthy in the first round, finishing the year with 20 wins and 18 losses. In 1994, she only played until April, and won only two of ten matches before retiring to start a family.

1995–1999
De los Ríos married Gustavo Neffa in 1994, and gave birth to Ana-Paula on January 17, 1997. With the marriage, she suspended her career until 1999-2000 when she returned to the WTA Tour in June 1999, after a five-year absence. In just her fifth tournament back, she won her fifth ITF title, in Buenos Aires, dropping just nine games in five matches. Her win–loss record for the year was 31–9.

2000
The year 2000 was the most successful year on the WTA Tour for de los Ríos. She won 22 out of 29 matches between March and June on the ITF circuit. In June, Rossana easily qualified for the main draw of the French Open, losing just eleven games in three matches. In the main draw, she beat Miroslava Vavrinec in the first round and Marlene Weingartner in the second round, before upsetting the world number ten, Amanda Coetzer, in three sets. She then fell to fellow qualifier Marta Marrero, the first time two qualifiers met in the fourth round of the French Open. In July, Rossana qualified for Wimbledon but was defeated by Tamarine Tanasugarn. After that, she won only one of her next five matches. Before the 2000 Sydney Olympics, de los Ríos and track athlete Edgar Baumann were left out of the delegation, confirmed by Ramón Zubizarreta, the president of the Paraguayan Olympic Committee. At the Games, she defeated Květa Peschke 6–3, 6–0 in the first round and Lindsay Davenport w/o. Jelena Dokić defeated her in the third round. De los Ríos finished the year with her return to the ITF circuit which saw her win 12 of her next 17 matches, including the finals at Miramar and Pittsburgh. in 2000, she won 45 matches and lost 21.

2001
Did not win two matches back-to-back until Madrid in May. In the first round she defeated Cristina Torrens Valero 6–1, 6–0, and then recorded her greatest victory to date, with a three-set win over world number six (at the time) Monica Seles.
:
She was defeated in the quarterfinals, however. At the French Open in June, Rossana defeated Elena Likhovtseva in the opening round before losing a tight match in the second round to Petra Mandula. She then lost in the first round of Wimbledon to Jelena Dokić. In Knokke-Heist (Tier IV) in July, Rossana defeated world number 20 (at the time) Silvia Farina Elia 6–3, 6–1 and reached the quarterfinals. Two months later, Rossana recorded her best WTA Tour appearance to date, advancing to the semifinals of Salvador, Bahia (Tier II) including another win over Silvia Farina Elia. Second seed Jelena Dokić put her run to an end. She finished the year with another semifinal in Pattaya City (Tier V), losing to Patty Schnyder in three sets. Her win–loss record finished at 25–28.

On 12 November 2001, she ranked 51.

2002
Advanced to the second round of the Australian Open for the first time in January. Reached the quarterfinals of Bogotá in February. Won just three of her next thirteen matches until the French Open in June, where she recorded a third round appearance but fell to Elena Dementieva. Advanced to the second round of Wimbledon but was defeated at the hands of Monica Seles. In September, Rossana reached the quarterfinals of Bali (Tier III) by upsetting top seed Tamarine Tanasugarn. She was then defeated by Conchita Martínez in straight sets. In Bratislava (Tier V), Rossana stunned Francesca Schiavone in straight sets and reached the quarterfinals. She led Slovenian Maja Matevžič 6–1, 5–2 but bowed out 6–1, 5–7, 1–6. She won 21 matches in total during the year, and lost 30.

2003
Rossana had a disappointing 2003 season. She did not reach the quarterfinals or better in any WTA Tour tournament, but on the ITF circuit she did manage to advance to the semifinals of Troy in October. She lost in the opening rounds of the Australian Open and the French Open, and was defeated 6–0, 6–0 by Kim Clijsters in the first round at Wimbledon. She won 29 matches (18 of which were in qualifying) and lost 29 matches. In 2003, de los Ríos ranked 52 in doubles.

2004–2005 and injuries
In 2004 Rossana did not compete in any WTA or ITF tournament until May due to injury. She won two matches in qualifying for the French Open in just her second tournament of the year, but lost in the final round. The following week she made the semifinals of Allentown on the ITF circuit, as well as the final of College Park in July. She lost in the first round of qualification at the US Open in September, but rebounded with a semifinal at Ashburn on the ITF circuit and more impressively, qualified for Philadelphia (Tier II) and reached the second round before being defeated by Anastasia Myskina. She won 19 matches during the year and lost a total of 13.

Things began well for Rossana in 2005, starting with a semifinal appearance in Waikoloa. However, a knee injury kept her out of play from February to October. Upon her return to the ITF circuit, Rossana had fallen over 100 positions on the WTA rankings- from No. 186 to 289. In her return tournament, she impressively reached the semifinals of Pelham, Alabama. In October, she reached the quarterfinals of San Francisco. She won nine matches out of sixteen for the year.

2006
Was Rossana's second most successful year on the WTA Tour. Although she won just five of her first nine matches, it was Indian Harbour Beach in May which saw Rossana reach her first ITF Final since College Park in 2004. Ranked as low as No. 452, she came through in qualifying, winning seven consecutive matches en route to the final. She was defeated by Edina Gallovits despite Rossana leading 5–0 in the final set and having six match points. Despite the loss, next week Rossana went on to reach the final in Palm Beach Gardens, beating the eighth, fourth and second seeds respectively, before losing in the final. In July she qualified for Cincinnati (Tier III) but lost to world number 26 (at the time) Katarina Srebotnik, after serving for the set at 5–3 in the second set. She reached the quarterfinals in Lexington, Kentucky later in the month, but lost to Stéphanie Dubois, despite leading 4–2 in the final set. She fell in the first round qualifying of the US Open to Erika Takao, in what was her first Grand Slam qualifying match in two years.

In November, she recorded her worst loss of the year in qualifying for Pittsburgh, but reversed it the next week with an impressive win over sixth seed Aleksandra Wozniak, to record her best win of the year. She went on to reach the Semifinals.

Two weeks later in December, de los Ríos claimed her first ITF title since 1999,  winning the Santaluz Club Open Tournament in San Diego, United States, beating sixth seed Ivana Abramović 6–0, 6–2 in the final. The win for Rossana encouraged her to compete in Australia in 2007, and resurrected her ranking to just outside the top 200.

She climbed 117 ranking positions in the year, from No. 386 to No. 209 in the twelve months, and won 31 matches compared to 14 losses.

2007
To commence 2007, Rossana suffered a first round defeat in $50K Waikoloa to start her 2007 season. In her next tournament, she reached the Semifinals of $25K Palm Desert, beating top seed Edina Gallovits 6–2, 6–1. In February, she fell in the first round of $75K Midland the next week but still secured a position inside the top 200 at No. 193- the first time she had broken into the top 200 since 2004. In late February, she competed in Acapulco (Tier III) at the Mexican Open, marking her first tier tournament since Cincinnati in July 2006. De los Ríos arrived at the tournament as the lowest ranked foreign player. She fell in the first round in a close match to the second seed Italian Tathiana Garbin. In April, Rossana represented Paraguay in the annual Federation Cup. Paraguay won all four matches in their Pool and defeated Ecuador in the play-off and as a result qualified for Group 1 of the Americas Zone for 2008. In early May, Rossana recorded her 19th and 20th quarterfinal appearances at $50K Charlottesville and $50K Indian Harbour Beach respectively. She fell to the eventual winner Edina Gallovits in both events, both times the score being 6–2, 6–2. The following week, Rossana won her first ITF title in 2007 and her sixth in her career in $25K Palm Beach Gardens. As the second seed, she won five matches in the process and lost just one set, beating former top ten player Brenda Schultz-McCarthy in the final.

Fresh from victory, Rossana quickly flew to Paris for the first time since 2004 to compete in the qualification event of Roland Garros. She caused a stir by easily qualifying, easily winning three straight sets matches. She lost to the 32nd seeded Martina Müller in straight sets in the first round.. Her next tournament was the $75K Přerov, where she reached the quarterfinals in singles, before losing to Sofia Arvidsson in straight sets, and reached the doubles final with her partner Edina Gallovits, where they lost to top seeds in three sets. A fortnight later she participated in the qualifying event in Wimbledon which marked her first grass-court match since 2003. She passed the first round in straight sets but lost to Anda Perianu, despite Rossana serving for the match at 5–3 in the final set. Rossana then flew to Italy and made back to back semifinal appearances in $25K Padova and $50K Cuneo, including a win over top seed Edina Gallovits in Cuneo. She then played in $100K Biella. There, she reached the second round losing to world number 36 Agnieszka Radwańska. Rossana then played in Rio de Janeiro for the Pan American Games, representing Paraguay. As the number four seed, she won her first round easily, but lost in the second round to Yamile Fors of Cuba, 7–6, 3–6, 7–5.

After this loss, she took some time off, and her next tournament was the US Open qualifying event. There, she lost in the first round to Carla Suarez Navarro. Next, Rossana went to the $50K Mestre in Italy. There, as the fifth seed, she won her second tournament of 2007, beating Alisa Kleybanova in the final. Straight after her victory, she went to the $100K Bordeaux but lost in the first round to the number seven seed, Ekaterina Bychkova, despite winning the first set. The next week, Rossana claimed her biggest ITF title to date and the eighth ITF title of her career in $75K Albuquerque. The victory marked her second title in just three weeks. En route to the title in Albuquerque, Rossana won five matches- three of them in three sets- resulting in her ranking rising from No. 136 to No. 114. Rossana then made two back to back quarterfinal appearances in $50K San Francisco and $50K Lawrenceville, Georgia. She lost in the first round of Quebec City and fell in the quarterfinals of $25K Mexico City to conclude the year.

2008
On Monday June 23, 2008, Rossana was beaten by then-world No. 1 Ana Ivanovic in the first round at Wimbledon. Rossana then played at the Palermo tournament and defeated fifth seed Aravane Rezaï.

2009
In January 2009, Rossana played in the Australian Open Women's Singles tournament for the first time since 2003. She won a match in qualifying at the Sydney Medibank International. At the Australian Open tournament, she was defeated 6–3 and 6–2 by Kirsten Flipkens on 19 January. She represented Paraguay in the Federation Cup two weeks later, where Paraguay lost 3–0 to Puerto Rico and 3–0 to Brazil, but defeated Uruguay 3–0 and Mexico 2–0 to secure Paraguay's position in the Americas Zone I for 2009. In February, Rossana played her first main draw WTA match for the year in Viña del Mar. She defeated Carla Suarez Navarro, which marked her first main draw WTA victory since Philadelphia in 2004. She also reached the second round in Bogotá and Miami, which resulted in her breaking back inside the WTA top 100 rankings for the first time since 2003. Rossana then reached the final of $25K Pelham, Alabama and in May she qualified for Strasbourg, winning three qualifying matches. She will compete in Roland Garros and for the first time in 19 Grand Slam events, Rossana's ranking will be high enough for her to directly enter the main draw.

2010
At the 2010 Australian Open, de los Ríos was eliminated in the first round to Marion Bartoli. In the 2010 Roland Garros, she was defeated 4–6, 6–1 and 6–0 by Samantha Stosur. She has not played in any WTA or ITF tournaments since the 2010 US Open.

WTA career finals

Doubles: 2 (2 runner-ups)

ITF finals

Singles (11–14)

Doubles: 10 (7–3)

Singles performance timeline

Personal life
She was known for changing her fame for love, when she married Paraguayan footballer Gustavo Neffa. Their wedding was on 26 December 1994. De los Ríos and Neffa have a daughter named Ana Paula, she was born on 17 January 1997. De los Ríos stopped playing for five years to dedicate time to her daughter, returning to tennis in 2000.

In 2002, de los Ríos commented about being one of the few mothers on the WTA Tour:

References

External links
 Olympics Profile
 ESPN Sports Profile
 Euro Sport Profile
 Los Deportes Info Profile
 
 
 

1975 births
Living people
Paraguayan expatriates in the United States
Paraguayan female tennis players
Sportspeople from Asunción
Tennis players at the 1992 Summer Olympics
Tennis players at the 2000 Summer Olympics
Olympic tennis players of Paraguay
Tennis players at the 2007 Pan American Games
Pan American Games competitors for Paraguay
Hopman Cup competitors
Grand Slam (tennis) champions in girls' singles
French Open junior champions